The Bucky O'Neill Monument, also known as the Rough Rider Monument, was created by Solon Borglum and is an equestrian sculpture of Buckey O'Neill and honors a group of men who gallantly served their country during the Spanish–American War in 1898. It is located at Courthouse Plaza, Prescott, Arizona. It was dedicated on July 3, 1907 and was rededicated on June 6, 1982, and again on July 3, 1998.

The inscription reads:

(Signature lower proper left side of sculpture)

(On relief plaque, back of granite boulder:)Solon Borglum

(On plaque, east side of granite boulder:)

ERECTED BY ARIZONA IN HONOR OF THE 1ST. U.S. VOLUNTEER CAVALRY, KNOWN TO HISTORY AS ROOSEVELT'S ROUGH RIDERS, AND IN MEMORY OF CAPTAIN WILLIAM O. O'NEILL  AND HIS COMRADES WHO DIED WHILE SERVING THEIR COUNTRY IN THE WAR WITH SPAIN

(On plaque, front of granite boulder:)UNVEILED JULY 3RD 1907

(On plaque, west side of granite boulder: names of commissioners)

(On plaque, on granite slab on concrete pad, in front of sculpture:)SOLON HANNIBAL BORGLUMAMERICA'S FIRST COWBOY SCULPTOR1868–1922THIS FREE-SPIRITED SON OF THE WEST, SENSITIVE TO THE CHANGING ERA IN WHICH HE LIVED, PORTRAYED THE WESTERN EPIC IN MARBLE AND BRONZE. OUR "BUCKY O'NEILL" MONUMENTAL BRONZE IS AMONG HIS GREATEST WORKS, AND IS ACCLAIMED BY THE CRITICS AS ONE OF THE FINEST EQUESTRIAN MONUMENTS IN THE WORLD.PLAQUE DEDICATED JUNE 6, 1982, PRESCOTT COMMUNITY ART TRUST

References
Notes

External links
 "Buckey O'Neill: A Rough Rider Cut Down In His Prime", NPR, July 28, 2011
 "The Captain O'Neill Rough Rider Monument" at the Sharlot Hall Museum in Prescott

1907 sculptures
Outdoor sculptures in Arizona
Equestrian statues in Arizona
Bronze sculptures in Arizona
Spanish–American War memorials in the United States
Sculptures of men in Arizona
Cultural depictions of military officers
Cultural depictions of American men
Statues of military officers
1907 establishments in Arizona Territory